Frank Crowley (29 May 1939 – 16 August 2022) was an Irish Fine Gael politician who served as a Teachta Dála (TD) for the Cork North-West constituency from 1981 to 1997.

Crowley first stood for election in the Cork Mid constituency at the 1977 general election. However, in the landslide victory for Fianna Fáil which saw Jack Lynch returned as Taoiseach with a 20-seat majority, Fianna Fáil took three of the five seats in Cork Mid, and Crowley was unsuccessful.

He stood again at the 1981 general election and was elected to the 22nd Dáil for the new constituency of Cork North-West. He was re-elected at five further general elections until he lost his seat at the 1997 general election.

In 1991, he topped the poll in elections to Cork County Council as a Councillor for the Kanturk local electoral area; he was re-elected in 1999, but did not contest the 2004 local elections.

Conway died in Cork on 16 August 2022, at the age of 83.

References

1939 births
2022 deaths
Fine Gael TDs
Local councillors in County Cork
Members of the 22nd Dáil
Members of the 23rd Dáil
Members of the 24th Dáil
Members of the 25th Dáil
Members of the 26th Dáil
Members of the 27th Dáil
People from Kanturk